Nate McCrary (born April 9, 1999) is an American football running back for the Cleveland Browns of the National Football League (NFL). He played college football at Saginaw Valley State.

College career
McCrary played for Saginaw Valley State, where, in 33 games, he rushed the ball 377 times for 1,889 yards and 28 touchdowns and in his junior and final season, he set career highs with 1,060 yards and 6.3 yards per carry and was named to the All-GLIAC First-team. He ranks fourth on the SVSU career rushing touchdowns all-time list.

Professional career

Baltimore Ravens
On May 1, 2021, McCrary was signed by the Baltimore Ravens as an undrafted free agent and was the Ravens' leading rusher in the preseason, carrying the ball 42 times for 163 yards and a touchdown. However, on August 31, 2021, he was waived by the Ravens.

Denver Broncos
On September 1, 2021, McCrary was claimed off waivers by the Denver Broncos. He was released on September 23, 2021.

Baltimore Ravens (second stint)
On September 25, 2021, McCrary was signed to the Baltimore Ravens practice squad. On January 18, 2022, McCrary signed a reserve/future contract with the Ravens.

On August 30, 2022, McCrary was waived by the Ravens.

Carolina Panthers
On November 1, 2022, McCrary was signed to the Carolina Panthers practice squad. He was released on December 13.

Cleveland Browns
On January 11, 2023, McCrary signed a reserve/future contract with the Cleveland Browns.

NFL career statistics

References

External links
Saginaw Valley State Cardinals bio
Denver Broncos bio

1999 births
Living people
American football running backs
Baltimore Ravens players
Carolina Panthers players
Cleveland Browns players
Denver Broncos players
Players of American football from Michigan
Saginaw Valley State Cardinals football players
Sportspeople from Muskegon, Michigan